Mushroom Corner is an unincorporated community in Thurston County, Washington, United States. Mushroom Corner is located in the urban growth area of Lacey, along Interstate 5 outside of Olympia, and is included in the Tanglewilde-Thompson Place Census-designated place (CDP) for Census purposes. The "corner" in Mushroom Corner is located at the intersection of Steilacoom Road SE and Marvin Road SE.

The community took takes its name from the local mushroom crop; the Ostrom Mushroom Farm operates nearby.

References

Unincorporated communities in Thurston County, Washington
Unincorporated communities in Washington (state)